UGS may stand for:

 UGS Corp., specializing in Product Lifecycle Management software
 Unconventional Gas Solutions, manufacturer of Membrane based gas generation and treatment systems
 Unattended ground sensor, used by U.S. Army to detect presence of persons or vehicles
 Union de la gauche socialiste, Union of Socialist Left, a defunct French left-wing party
 Urmston Grammar, in Greater Manchester, England
 Utah Genealogical Society
 Utah Geological Survey, in Salt Lake City, Utah
 Utah Golden Spikers, an American soccer club in Salt Lake City, Utah
 Uttam Galva Steels, steel manufacturer in India
 Underground gas storage, see natural gas storage

See also 
 Uggs, see Ugg boots